Space Rangers can refer to:

Comics
Space Ranger, a comic book hero by DC Comics.

Film and TV
Buzz Lightyear, a space ranger in the Toy Story series.
Rocky Jones, Space Ranger, a syndicated science fiction television serial originally broadcast in the early 1950s that lasted for one season.
Space Rangers could also mean the designation of the Ranger incarnation from Power Rangers in Space.
Space Rangers (TV series), a 1993 television series about a small police force in 2104 at Planet Avalon's Fort Hope.

Video games
Space Rangers (video game) a 2002 video game by the Russian game developer Elemental Games.
Space Rangers 2: Dominators (2004), a sequel to the 2002 Space Rangers video game.

Music
"Space Ranger", song by Can from I Want More (Can song)
"Space Ranger", song by Scandal (Japanese band)